Allan Stuart is a paralympic athlete from Great Britain competing mainly in category T20 sprint events.

Stuart competed in the 2000 Summer Paralympics in Sydney competing in the 100m and winning a silver medal in the T20 400m.

References

Paralympic athletes of Great Britain
Athletes (track and field) at the 2000 Summer Paralympics
Paralympic silver medalists for Great Britain
British male sprinters
Living people
Medalists at the 2000 Summer Paralympics
Year of birth missing (living people)
Paralympic medalists in athletics (track and field)